Alois Kvitek (14 October 1888 – 1967) was an Austrian footballer. He played in one match for the Austria national football team in 1908.

References

External links
 

1888 births
1967 deaths
Austrian footballers
Austria international footballers
Place of birth missing
Association footballers not categorized by position